Death at the Dolphin is a detective novel by Ngaio Marsh. It is the twenty-fourth novel to feature Roderick Alleyn, and was first published in 1966 as Killer Dolphin in the United States. The plot centres on a glove once owned by Hamnet Shakespeare, on display at a newly renovated theatre called the Dolphin. Several characters from the novel return in Marsh's final book, Light Thickens.

Awards and nominations 
The book was nominated for the Edgar Allan Poe Award for Best Novel of the Year in 1967, losing to Nicholas Freeling's The King of the Rainy Country.

Plot
On a whim, rising theatre director Peregrine Jay views a derelict Victorian playhouse, The Dolphin Theatre on London's South Bank, where he falls into a wartime bomb crater on the stage and is rescued from drowning by the theatre's owner, the enigmatic multi-millionaire Vassily Conducis, who listens to and finances the young theatre practitioner's vision of a restored Dolphin Theatre, which duly opens with the premiere of Jay's play 'The Glove", inspired by a cheverel glove Conducis owns and has shown to Jay, with faded documents suggesting it was made for Shakespeare's only son Hamnet, who died young. The glove is, of course, a public sensation and publicity coup for the new theatre and its opening production, which is a complete triumph, despite tensions among Jay's talented but fractious company. During the sold-out run, the glove is stolen and Harry Jobbins, the chirpy cockney nightwatchman is viciously battered to death by one of the two dolphin statues in the theatre foyer, commissioned by Conducis, while the obnoxiously precocious child actor playing Hamnet Shakespeare is attacked and all but killed. Inspector Roderick Alleyn, initially tasked with security arrangements for the glove, is assigned to investigate the murder and duly identifies the murderer, as well as the history of how Mr Conducis came to own the Shakespearian glove. The novel's murder plot is set against an engrossing account of how a historic London theatre is rescued from oblivion and a Shakespearian-themed modern play is produced, staged and launched into a solid West End triumph, with all the accompanying backstage dramas and tensions.

Roderick Alleyn novels
1966 British novels
Novels about actors
Collins Crime Club books
British detective novels
British mystery novels
Novels set in London